Linguists use a variety of symbols to represent not just single sounds, but certain particular classes of sounds. They are usually capital letters. This article lists those "cover symbols".

Consonants

Vowels

Capitalised vowels are commonly used in discussions of languages with vowel harmony. They often indicate different harmonic variants of an underlying archiphonemic vowel.

Phonetics